DAM is a Palestinian hip-hop group. DAM was founded in 1999 by brothers Tamer and Suhell Nafar and their friend Mahmoud Jreri. Their songs are largely about racism, freedom,  Israeli occupation and poverty .

DAM raps primarily in Arabic, but also in English. DAM has released more than 100 singles and three albums—Dedication, Dabke on the Moon and Ben Haana Wa Maana—as well as an EP—Street Poetry. DAM's lyrics are largely protest-driven, and their songs were centering around fighting against oppression, Israeli occupation, racism, poverty, drugs, and for women's rights.

In January 2017, they signed with the London-based independent record label publishing and services, Cooking Vinyl. For their UK and EU touring schedule, the band is represented by X-Ray Touring.

Etymology
The group's name is the Arabic verb for "to last forever/eternity" (دام), but can also be an acronym for "Da Arabian MCs." The Arabic word for "blood" (دم) is spelled similarly, but without an alif.

History

(1979–1999) Beginning and Tamer’s solo career 
Tamer Nafar, Suhell Nafar and Mahmoud Jreri were born and raised in Israel. Tamer and Suhel were born to Fayez Nafar and Nadia Awadi. Fayez had been disabled for most of Tamer and Suhel's lives due to a car accident. Mahmood Jreri was born to Ibrahim Jreri and Shadia Hassuneh.
Tamer, Suhel, and Mahmoud all grew up in poverty, neighborhoods they call "ghettos" in their music, that were full of drive-by's and drug dealing.
In 1996, when he was 17 years old, Tamer discovered Hip Hop through Tupac Amaru Shakur's songs, and started to learn English while memorizing Tupac's lyrics and translating them into Arabic using an English-Arabic dictionary. Tamer recorded his first single, "Untouchable," a reference to "The Untouchables” movie. In 1998, Tamer released his first EP, "Stop Selling Drugs," featuring his younger brother, Suhell Nafar. The two met Mahmoud at a private show that they organized, and together they decided to form DAM in late 1999.

(1999–2000) Formation and development 
DAM started recording songs on their home computer, and most of their songs back then were recorded over known Hip Hop instrumentals. At the time, the Hip-Hop scene in Palestine was developing largely, and DAM in particular, got their start performing in Jerusalem the capital of Palestine . As a result, most of their earlier music was performed in Arabic. At the beginning of the group's history, DAM's music and lyrics focused mostly around everyday life, performing, and emotions, not containing many political references. But this changed with time. On September 3, 2000, Tamer's friend Booba (Hussam Abu Gazazae) was shot down and killed during a drive-by, an incident that drove Tamer to record his first protest song with a political reference.
A cover of Abd al Majeed Abdalla's song "Ya Tayeb al Galb", the song was called "Booba" and featured Ibraheem Sakallah in the hook.

(2000-2001) Innocent Criminals, Who Is The Terrorist, and Channels of Rage 
In the outbreak of the Second Intifada in October 2000, Tamer and Mahmood decided to write their first direct political song, "Posheem Hapim me Peshaa' – Innocent Criminals." It was recorded over an instrumental of "Hail Mary"  by Tupac, and featured inciting lines such as "When Jews protest, the cops use clubs / When Arabs protest, the cops takes their souls" and "If it is a democracy, how come I'm not mentioned in your Anthem" followed by the chorus "Before you judge me, before you understand me, walk in my shoes, and you will hurt your feet, because we are criminal, innocent criminals." The song created controversy in the Israeli media, and it put DAM in conflict with some Israeli rappers, such as Subliminal, with much of the subsequent fall-out being recorded in the documentary Channels of Rage. Despite the controversy, the song was later remixed by the Israeli rock musician Aviv Geffen, with American-Israeli director Udi Aloni making a music video for the song in 2003.

Around that time, and after listening to the Algerian French Hip Hop CD "MBS – Micro Brise le Silence," Tamer got convinced to give it a shot in Arabic; after a few experiences, he released his first official single "Min al Ta lal Alef lal M E R – From the T to the A to the M E R" over the R. Kelly's instrumental feat Nas "Have you ever thought" the song hit number one charts in all of the Arab radios bringing DAM to the Palestinian mainstream and making them the group with the largest following and to non-stop shows in the years 2000 till 2003, a lot of Rappers and Hip Hop bands started their career after that single, the whole Palestinian Hip Hop scene started to spread, studios were opened and workshops for self-expression through rhymes started around. Around 2001, after a bombing in Tel Aviv, Israelis gathered around the Hassan Beck mosque in Yafa, throwing stones at it and screaming "Death to the terrorist Arabs". DAM released their breakthrough single "Meen Erhabi? – Who is the terrorist?" the song opens with the screaming of the Israelis in front of the mosque, then over the Atmosphere instrumental "If I was Santa," they rap their verses. The song created an International buzz and was downloaded more than a million time in one month; the French magazine The Rolling Stone made a big article about the song and released a compilation with that magazine that featured DAM's Meen Erhabi and other International artists such as Manu Chao and Zebda, at that same time, Udi Aloni released his second documentary "Local Angel" that also featured DAM and they toured around Europe with the film, the tour included France, Germany, and Belgium and it was the beginning of DAM's international career. Later on, a video clip of the song was made by Palestinian/Syrian director Jackie Salloum.

In 2003 Anat Halachmi, an Israeli film director, released the documentary Channels of Rage. The film follows Tamer Nafar and DAM on one side and on the other side the right-wing Zionist rapper Kobi Shimoni (Subliminal and the Shadow). Anat followed them for almost 3 years. The film shows their relations and beefs through Hip Hop; the film won the Volgin Award for the best documentary in the Jerusalem film festival 2003.

(2004) The Born Here campaign 
In 2004 the group was invited by the Shateel organization to do a song that talks about discrimination in Israel, the Palestinian neighborhoods suffering from poverty, unemployment, and house demolitions by Israel, in Lyd the main entrance to the Palestinian neighborhoods is through 8 train tracks that you must cross by walking; as a result, more than 10 Palestinians were killed by trains.
The group featured a local Palestinian R&B singer Abir al Zinati and they created a song called "Kan Noladti – Born Here" as a reference to a known Israeli song by "Dats and Datsa" that said, "I was born here, my children were born here, and this is where we built our houses with our hands", DAM changed it to "I was born here, my grandparents were born here, and this is where you destroyed our houses with your hands".
The song was followed by a video clip by the late Juliano Mer Khamis (A Jewish actor).

The Born Here Campaign also featured a bus tour in the Palestinian neighborhoods for Israel's top celebrities. The campaign created a huge local media outrage. Many artists joined the ride, among which were: Moni Moshonov, Aviv Geffen, Ha Yehudim, Yoav Kutner, Gila Almagor, and many more. As a result of the campaign, Israel was finally forced to build bridges above the train tracks.

"When we say Hip Hop is a bridge, we mean it metaphorically and Literary," said Tamer in his TEDEX speech at 2012, Nazareth.
Tamer maintained to make political and historical tours after that, for schools, local and foreign groups, and for International artists such as Erykah Badu, Ezra Koenig from the American Rock band - Vampire's Weekend, Michael Franti, Gbenga Akinnagbe actor on the TV show The Wire. The Born Here Campaign with DAM also toured Israel to spread awareness for the campaign.

(2006) First official album "Ihdaa' – Dedication" – DAM’s international career 

After touring the world and releasing number one singles in the Arab Radios, DAM signed with the British Label "RCM – Red Circle Music" to market the album in Europe and gave the licensing to EMI Arabia to distribute the album in the Arab countries, they also signed with the French booking agency 3D Family to tour in the biggest music festivals around the world. Such as Sundance's film festival, Womad, Doha DIFF (Doha International film festival), Dubai Film Festival, Trinity International HipHop Festival USA, Vine Rock, Taybeh Beer Festival Palestine, Casa Festival (Morocco) and it got them to share stages with many worldwide artists such as GZA of the Wutang Clan, Mos Def, Talib Kweli, Dead Prez, Chuck D of Public Enemy, Pharaoh Monch, Rachid Taha, Ahmad al khoushry, Immortal Technique and many more.
The album included 15 tracks, and some number one hits.

(2008) Slingshot Hip Hop
In 2008 Slingshot Hip Hop – the official film about Palestinian Hip Hop by Jackie Salloum was released. the first screening was at the Sundance film festival and featured guest appearances by Chuck D from Public Enemy and Africa Bambataa. The film covers the Palestinian Hip Hop scene in general and DAM in particular. DAM members attended and performed at Sundance and held a Q&A conference at the festival.
The Film and its self-titled soundtrack feature other Palestinian artists such as Mahmoud Shalabi, Abir al Zinati (Sabreena the Witch), WE7, PR, Arapeyat, and Khalifa E. The soundtrack was mostly recorded at Sabreen Studio, East Jerusalem; the album had songs such "Who is the terrorist" by DAM,  "Tzakar" by PR, "Blinded Freedom" by Shalabi, "The witch's Uprising" by Abeer and Suhell Nafar and “Sot el Samt” by WE7. Following the film's success, DAM started touring the US, holding around 60 shows a year.

(2009)  Wanted: An Arab without a Memory 
In 2009, Israel started to advertise their campaign for Israel's Palestinian citizens to serve in the National Service instead of the Army, and the campaign was fought back by all of the Palestinian organizations and activists. Baladna organization started a campaign against the National Service and have asked DAM to write and record a theme song for the campaign; the song was produced by Rimon Haddad and became the theme of the Palestinian agenda that refused to serve the colonization by any means, the campaign led into a tour in what's left of Palestinian cities in Israel, the artists that participated in it were: DAM, Amer Hlehel, Ayman Nahas, Hanna Shammas, Tarez Suliman and many more.
2010 Targeted Citizen
DAM were asked by Adaleh's organization to participate in a short film that describes the Israeli legal discrimination towards Palestinians, DAM was offered to meet with Adaleh's lawyers, ask questions and regarding the answer, they will go to the studio followed by the camera and record a song about it. DAM came out with the song "Muwaten Mustahdaf – Targeted Citizen", the directors liked the title of the song, so they ended up using it for the title of the whole film and the campaign.
The song was produced by Anan Kusseim from WE7 at the Underground Studio (That Ardi), and the introduction was recorded by the Director Firas Khoushry.

(2011) A Letter from the Cell 
After 5 years of performing and touring, and participating in other Artists' projects, DAM decided to release the first single from their future album "Nudbok Al Amar – Dabka on the Moon".
The name of the first single is "Risale min Zinzane - A Letter from the Cell", they featured in the song Trio Joubran and Bachar Marcell Khalifa. During the writing process of the song, DAM met with the Addameer organization a few times to collect information, personal stories, and letters so they can create three fictional characters that will be based on true stories. The song was supposed to be released with the album, but after the Palestinian prisoners' hunger strike, DAM decided to release the unfinished version to support the prisoners.
Other unofficial singles were released to the Internet by fans, songs from shows such as their first English song, "Mama, I fell in love with a Jew," a story about a Palestinian guy who gets stuck in the elevator with a Jewish girl and they fell in love. The difference is that in the elevator, the girl was going up, and the Palestinian guy was going down, a view on coexistence that Israel is promoting; the message of the song is existence before coexistence. Another song of the upcoming album is "Shi'r al Share' – Street Poetry," a club song with an Arabic pop sound composed and arranged by the Danish producer Billy Beautiful; the song is canceling the politicians and giving the lead role to the Artist, the true voice of the streets.

(2012) Second Official album: Dabke on the Moon

(2012) First Music Video Single from Dabke: "If I could go back in time" 

"If I could go back in time" ft Amal Murkus
A song that talks in general about women's rights and freedom, and specifically about the crimes that are being committed against women.

“the Music video have  English subtitles on YouTube” .

Discography
Albums
Ihda' (2006)
Dabke on the Moon (2012)
Ben Haana Wa Maana (2019)

Contributing artist
The Rough Guide To Arabic Revolution (2013)

DAM in TV and cinema
(2002) Local angel (as DAM)
(2003) Channels of Rage by Anat Halachmi (as DAM)
(2007) Forgiveness (as DAM)
(2007) DAM – UK London by Eliot Manches (as DAM)
(2008) Slingshot Hip Hop by Jackie Salloum (as DAM and Suhell Nafar  as the narrator)
(2008) Salt of the sea by Annemarie Jacir (DAM's Song Shidu al Himme produced by K Salaam, and a Small part by Tamer Nafar as a waiter)
(2008) Where in the world is Osama Ben Laden? By Morgan Spurlock (In the soundtrack – Mali Huriye – I have no freedom song)
(2009) Checkpoint Rock – Songs for Palestine by Fermin Muguruza and Javier Corcuera (as DAM and Suhell Nafar  as the narrator)
(2010) Targeted citizen by Rahel Lea Jones (as DAM)
(2011) Habibi Rasak Kharban by Susan Youssef (Tamer & Suhell Nafar  in a small part as fishermen)
(2012) I'lam Media Center: I have the right! By Firas Khoury (Tamer Nafar as himself)
(2012) Yala on the Moon (Yala al Amar) by Jackie Salloum and Suhell Nafar  (DAM in the soundtrack and Tamer Nafar in a small part as a driver)
(2012) Art/Violence, a documentary by Udi Aloni,  Cinema Fairbindet Prize awarded in the Berlinale film festival 2012, DAM were part of the characters in the movie and their music video "If I Could Go Back in TIme-Law Arjaa bil Zaman" was used in the movie, as well Tamer Nafar was part of the Producers of the movie.
(2012) Insha'Allah a Canadian/French feature film directed by Anaïs Barbeau-Lavalette, the movie uses in one of the scenes 2 songs "Love us and Buy us - Hibuna Ishtruna ( from Ihdaa/Dedication) and the single "Targeted Citizen - Muwaten Mustahdaf"

References

A link to" A letter from a cell" song (Translated to English)
A teaser of the Street Poetry song edited by Suhell Nafar 
A link to a live performance of the Song "Mama, I'm In love with a Jew" (Over the Ghostface feat Neyo beat – Back like That")in the Southpaw club in NY, 2009 - featuring The Narcicyst.
A link to the Targeted Citizen Film
A Link to Born Here's clip – DAM ft Abir al Zinati (AKA Sabreena the Witch)
Link to Who's the Terrorist Video by Jackie Salloum
A link to the Innocent Criminals video clip featuring Aviv Geffen
DAM:LONDON – official 15-minute documentary film, shot during DAM's brief visit to the UK in October 2006

External links
DAM - The Official Website
DAM - Official Youtube Page
DAM - The Official Facebook Page
DAM - The Official Twitter Account
DAM - SoundCloud
DAM - MySpace page
SlingShot HipHop - The official Website

Hip hop groups
Musical groups established in 1999
People from Lod
Political music groups
Palestinian musical groups
1999 establishments in Israel
Anti-racism in Israel
Anti-racism in Palestine